Aleksander Mikhailovich Rekunkov (October 27, 1920, hut. Stogovsky, Don region, RSFSR - May 2, 1996, Moscow) was Soviet and Russian lawyer. Prosecutor General of the USSR from 1981 to 1988.

References

External links

Central Committee of the Communist Party of the Soviet Union members
Tenth convocation members of the Supreme Soviet of the Soviet Union
Eleventh convocation members of the Soviet of the Union
Communist Party of the Soviet Union members
1920 births
1996 deaths
Burials at Kuntsevo Cemetery
Attorneys general
Kutafin Moscow State Law University alumni